A penumbral lunar eclipse will occur on November 8, 2060. It will be too small to be visually perceptible.


Visibility 

In the unlikely assumption that it’s perceptible, it would be visible over North America and South America, and will be seen rising over Africa and Europe.

Related eclipses

Saros

Lunar year series

Metonic series
This eclipse is the fifth and final of five Metonic cycle lunar eclipses on the same date, November 8–9, each separated by 19 years:

References 

21st-century lunar eclipses